Gartcosh, Glenboig and Moodiesburn is one of the twenty-one wards used to elect members of the North Lanarkshire Council. It had a population of 14,004 in 2019.

It was created in 2017 following a national boundary review that recommended increased representation for the area overall – this led to the eastern third of the Strathkelvin ward and the northern half of the Coatbridge North and Glenboig ward being merged to cover the settlements of Gartcosh, Glenboig and Moodiesburn, returning three councillors (the existing wards were renamed Stepps, Chryston and Muirhead and Coatbridge North respectively).

Councillors

Election Results

2017 Election
 
 

* = Sitting councillor for Coatbridge North and Glenboig ward

References

Wards of North Lanarkshire